Robin Charters (29 October 1930 – 20 May 2013) was a Scotland international rugby union player. He became the 106th President of the Scottish Rugby Union.

Rugby Union career

Amateur career

Charters played for Hawick.

Provincial career

He played for South of Scotland District in the 1954–55 Scottish Inter-District Championship.

International career

He played for Scotland 3 times in 1955.

Administrative career

He became the 106th President of the Scottish Rugby Union. He served the standard one year from 1992 to 1993.

References

1930 births
2013 deaths
Hawick RFC players
Presidents of the Scottish Rugby Union
Rugby union players from Hawick
Scotland international rugby union players
Scottish rugby union players
South of Scotland District (rugby union) players
Rugby union centres